Today's modern roller coasters, both wooden and steel, have the same basic design of wheel assembly. Each wheel assembly has three wheels: underfriction, or up-stop, wheels; tractor, or running, wheels; and side friction wheels. All of these help the train move safely and smoothly.

All modern roller coasters have up-stop wheels that hug the bottom of the rail. As their name implies, they prevent the train from coming up off the track. Side friction wheels hug the sides of the rail, either the outside or inside, depending on the track manufacturer. These wheels help the train stay in the center of the two rails to keep the train from derailing. The last wheel set are called tractor wheels, or running wheels. Tractor wheels have a simple but important purpose. These wheels  bear the weight of the train on the track, keeping the train running on the track. Tractor wheels may lift off the track when the vertical g-force is zero or negative, but the up-stop wheels keep the train from coming completely off the rails.

Steel roller coaster wheels are made with polyurethane which increase ride efficiency and have no chemical bond to the rail. Steel roller coaster wheel assemblies can change slightly with different manufacturers. A good example of this is the difference between B&M's track style and Arrow's. On B&M's coasters, the trains have their side friction wheels on the outside of the track, allowing the rails to connect from their inner edges. On Arrow coasters, the train has side friction wheels on the inside of the track, so the rail connectors must "wrap around" the outside of the rail and under the train.

Notes

The American Roller coaster, Scott Rutherford, 

Roller coaster technology